The Artillery Corps (ARTY) are the artillery corps of the Irish Army. The Corps provides fire support to other sections of the Army. The Corps was first founded in 1924.

Organisation
From the Emergency (1939-1945), the Artillery Corps was organised into separate Coastal Defence, Field Artillery and Air Defence Regiments. In the late 20th century, the Coastal Defence component was dissolved and integrated with the Field Artillery component. In 2013 the Air Defence regiment also ceased to operate as a separate component, and the Field Artillery regiments, known as Brigade Artillery Regiments, took over the Air Defence role.

Today the Artillery Corps comprises the Artillery School, located in the Defence Forces Training Centre (DFTC) in the Curragh Camp, and two Brigade Artillery Regiments (one for each of the two Brigades of the army). They are located in Collins Barracks, Cork (1 BAR) and Custume Barracks, Athlone (2 BAR).

Weapons

Field artillery
L118 & L119 105mm howitzers (main artillery support weapon)
 Brandt 81mm mortars
Ruag 120mm heavy mortars
Ordnance QF 25-pounder retained for use as a ceremonial gun

Air defence
RBS-70 Surface to Air Missile system
Browning .50 caliber HMG (on "cobra" mount)

References

External links
 The Artillery Corps | Irish Army

Administrative corps of the Irish Army
Artillery administrative corps
Military units and formations established in 1924